Real de Banjul Football Club is a Gambian professional association football club based in Banjul. The team compete in the GFA League First Division, the top flight of Gambian football league system. Real de Banjul is the most successful club in Gambian football history, having won a record 12 national titles

History
Real de Banjul was founded in the 1966–67 season after a group of secondary schoolboys international team returned from a trip to Thiès in Senegal and named it as Benson and Hedges FC.  The name was eventually changed by the then Director of Youth and Sports to Real de Bathurst FC and upon its registration with the Gambia Football Federation, it headquartered at 81 Lancaster Street, Banjul. The team witnessed another name change in 1970 changing to its present name of Real de Banjul which led to the expansion of the team having basketball, volleyball and athletics teams. The team then consisted of the youngest talented players in comparison to other local teams and won its first league title in 1971–72.

The first two cup titles were won in 1969 and 1970. Real de Banjul's cup final results in 1970 defeated White Phantoms 2–1, the club lost to Gambia Ports Authority in 1975 and later in 1980. Real lost to win their third title in 1993 after losing to Wallidan 2–1, they got their recent cup title in 1997 after defeating Hawks. The club lost to again to Wallidan in 2002 in their recent cup final appearance.

As champion winner, the club competed in the 2012 Gambian Super Cup and won their only title.

Their first continental appearance was in 1975 after winning their second title and withdrew from a match with Guinea's Hafia FC. Their first match was played a year later against Mali's Djoliba AC. After winning their fourth title, the club advanced in the second round and challenged Liberia's Saint Joseph Warriors where they scored their first goal and won their first match at the continentals for Real, later the club lost two legs to Ghana's Hearts of Oak. Real Banjul competed against the club from Guinea-Bissau further south Sporting Bissau and lost the second leg. The club competed in 1995 and defeated Cape Verde's CD Travadores, then the club faced Mbilnga from Gabon and the second match was abandoned at the 70th minute.  Four years later in 1999, the club faced another Guinea's club AS Kaloum Star, the first leg won 0–2 while the second lost 4–1, in 2001, the club faced FC Derby from Mindelo, Cape Verde and defeated 1–0 in the second leg, then faced ASC Diaraf from Dakar in the neighboring Senegal up northwest and scored only a goal in the first match, as they scored nothing in the second match, they lost.  As the 2007 national champion, Real Banjul withdrew in early December and did not participate in the 2008 CAF Champions League. Their next appearance was twelve years later in the 2013 season, the club challenged with FUS Rabat and won 2–1 and was out as the away team succeeded. Their recent appearance was the 2015 season and succeeded up to the first round.

Uniform

Its uniform color is red with a white right sash, sleeve and short edges for home games and the opposite being white with a red right sash, sleeve and short edges.

Its uniform color for home games was white with blue lining near its edges.

Achievements
GFA League First Division: 12
 1972, 1974, 1975, 1978, 1983, 1994, 1997, 1998, 2000, 2007, 2012, 2014.

Gambian Cup: 3
  1969, 1970, 1997.

Gambian Super Cup: 3
  2000, 2012, 2014.

League and cup history

Performance in CAF competitions

National level

Statistics
Best position: Second Round (continental)
Best position at a cup competition: First Round (continental)
Total matches played at the CAF Champions League: 22
Total matches played at home: 11
Total matches played away: 11
Total matches played at the continental cup competitions: 2

Managers

Notes

References

Further reading

External links
 Realdebanjul.gm (official website)

 
Banjul
Football clubs in the Gambia
1966 establishments in the Gambia
Association football clubs established in 1966